is a 2006 Japanese-animated science fiction romance film produced by Madhouse, directed by Mamoru Hosoda and written by Satoko Okudera. Released by Kadokawa Herald Pictures, the film is a loose sequel to the 1967 novel of the same name by Yasutaka Tsutsui and shares the basic premise of a teenage girl who gains the power of time travel and repeatedly relives the same day in a time loop, but with a different story and characters than the novel. Riisa Naka voices teenager Makoto Konno, who learns from Kazuko Yoshiyama, Makoto's aunt and the protagonist to the original story, that Makoto has the power to travel through time. Makoto begins using the time-leaps frivolously to fix problems. Riisa Naka later portrays Makoto's cousin, Akari Yoshiyama, the protagonist of the 2010 film Time Traveller: The Girl Who Leapt Through Time, which follows a different story.

The Girl Who Leapt Through Time was released on July 15, 2006, and received positive reviews. The film won numerous awards, including the Japan Academy Film Prize for Animation of the Year. The English version was licensed and produced by Kadokawa Pictures U.S., with dubbing supplied by Ocean Productions, and released by Bandai Entertainment in 2008 and re-released by Funimation in 2016.

Plot 

At Kuranose High School in Tokyo, Japan, 17-year-old Makoto Konno discovers a message written on a blackboard and ends up inadvertently falling onto a walnut-shaped object. On her way to the Tokyo National Museum to meet with her aunt, Kazuko Yoshiyama, she is ejected into a railroad crossing when the brakes on her bicycle fail and hit by an oncoming train, but finds herself transported back in time when she was riding her bicycle right before the accident. After telling Kazuko what happened, she helps Makoto realize she now has the power to "time-leap", the ability to literally travel through time. At first, Makoto uses her powers to avoid being late, get perfect grades, avoid mishaps and even relive a single karaoke session for several hours, but soon discovers her actions can adversely affect others.

Consequently, Makoto uses most of her leaps frivolously to prevent undesirable situations from happening, including an awkward love confession from her best friend, Chiaki Mamiya. Makoto realizes she has a numbered tattoo on her arm indicating the limited number of times she can time leap. Using her remaining time leaps, Makoto attempts to make things right for everyone. When Chiaki calls Makoto to ask if she has been time-leaping, she uses her final time-leap to prevent Chiaki's call. In the meantime, Makoto's friend Kōsuke Tsuda and his new girlfriend, Kaho Fujitani, borrow her faulty bike. Makoto attempts to stop them, but as she had just used her final leap, she is unable to rescue them from being hit by the train.

A moment later, Chiaki freezes time. Telling Makoto he is from the future, he explains the walnut-shaped object is his time-traveling device, and used it to time-leap hoping to see a painting that Kazuko is restoring, as it has been destroyed in the future. While walking with Makoto in the frozen city, Chiaki explains why he stayed longer in her time than he originally planned. Consequently, he has used his final leap to prevent Kōsuke and Kaho from the train accident and he has stopped time only to explain to Makoto he is unable to return to his own time period, and having revealed his origins and the nature of the item that allowed Makoto to leap through time, Chiaki must leave. Then Makoto realizes she is in love with him.

True to his words, Chiaki disappears once time resumes. Initially distraught by Chiaki's disappearance, Makoto discovers Chiaki's time-leap inadvertently restored her final time-leap: Chiaki leaped back to the time before Makoto used it. Makoto uses it to safely leap back to the moment right after she originally gained her powers; Chiaki would still have his one remaining time-leap. Recovering the used up time-travel device, she explains her knowledge of everything as she shows it to Chiaki. Makoto vows to ensure the painting's existence so Chiaki can see it in his era. Before Chiaki departs, he tells Makoto he will be waiting for her in the future. When Kōsuke asks her where Chiaki went, she tells him Chiaki went to study abroad. She has made a decision about her own future.

Characters

Release
The film received limited advertising as opposed to other animation features, but word of mouth and positive reviews generated interest. At Theatre Shinjuku for days in a row, filmgoers filled the theater with some even standing to watch the film. Following this, distribution company Kadokawa Herald Pictures increased the number of theaters showing the film across Japan, and submitted the film for international festival consideration.

North American distributor Bandai Entertainment premiered the film in North America on November 19, 2006, at the Waterloo Festival for Animated Cinema and on March 3, 2007, at the 2007 New York International Children's Film Festival. The movie received a limited release in the United States, being shown subtitled in Los Angeles in June, and in Seattle in September. Also, an English dubbed version was shown in New York City in July. Its Boston area showings in August were subtitled. The film has also premiered in the UK as part of the Leeds Young People's Film Festival on April 2, 2008. The film was made available on Cable VOD on December 1, 2010, throughout the United States on numerous major cable systems, such as Comcast, Time Warner, and Cox, among others, by VOD distributor Asian Media Rights, under the Asian Crush label.

In South Korea, it released in June 2007. The film grossed  in South Korea.

The film returned to Japanese cinemas on 4DX screens on April 2 for the 10th anniversary of Studio Chizu, the Studio Hosoda set up to produce his newer works, and the 15th anniversary of the film. An updated poster of classic visual has been released alongside a new trailer. The 2021 release was screened nationwide (excluding some cinemas) with United Cinemas as the distributor.

Critical response
The review aggregation website Rotten Tomatoes reported an 84% approval rating based on 16 reviews with an average rating of 6.7/10, and the site's consensus: "An imaginative and thoughtfully engaging anime film with a highly effective visual design. This coming-of-age comedy drama has mad inventiveness to spare."

Justin Sevakis of Anime News Network praised the film for its "absolute magic." Sevakis felt that the film has "more in common with the best shoujo manga than [author Yasutaka] Tsutsui's other work Paprika". He said that the voice acting has "the right amount of realism [for the film]". Ty Burr of The Boston Globe praised the film's visuals and pace. He also compared the film to the works of Studio Ghibli. Nick Pinkerton of The Village Voice said, "there's real craftsmanship for how [the film] sustains its sense of summer quietude and sun-soaked haziness through a few carefully reprised motifs: three-cornered games of catch, mountainous cloud formations, classroom still-lifes." Pinkerton also said that the film is the "equivalent of a sensitively wrought read from the Young Adult shelf, and there's naught wrong with that." Author Yasutaka Tsutsui praised the film as being "a true second-generation" of his book at the Tokyo International Anime Fair on March 24, 2006.

Accolades  

It won the Animation Grand Award, given to the year's most entertaining animated film, at the prestigious sixty-first Annual Mainichi Film Awards. It received the Grand Prize in the animation division at the 2006 Japan Media Arts Festival. It won the Special Distinction for Feature Film at France's thirty-first Annecy International Animated Film Festival on June 16, 2007. It played to full-house theatres during a screening in August 2007 at the ninth Cinemanila International Film Festival in Manila, Philippines.

Soundtrack 
All music by Kiyoshi Yoshida, except where noted. Piano played by Haruki Mino.

 "Natsuzora (Opening theme)"
 "Sketch"
 "Aria (Goldberg Hensoukyoku Yori)" (Goldberg Variations by Bach)
 "Karakuri Tokei (Time Leap)"
 "Shoujo no Fuan"
 "Sketch (Long Version)"
 "Daylife"
 "Daiichi Hensoukyoku (Goldberg Hensoukyoku Yori)" (Variation 1 of Goldberg Variations by Bach)
 "Mirai no Kioku"
 "Seijaku"
 "Kawaranai Mono (Strings version)" (Hanako Oku)
 "Natsuzora (Ending theme)"
 "Time Leap (Long version)"
 "Natsuzora (Long version)"
 "Garnet (Yokokuhen short version)" (Oku)

Both songs were written, composed, and performed by singer-songwriter Hanako Oku. "Garnet" was arranged by Jun Satō and "Kawaranai Mono (Strings Version)" was arranged by Yoshida.

Manga

The film was adapted into a manga by Ranmaru Kotone and was serialized in Shōnen Ace a few months before the film's theatrical release. It received a 2009 English-language release for the Australian region with licensing by Bandai Entertainment and distribution by Madman Entertainment. The manga largely follows the same story as the film with some slight differences. Notably, the manga opens differently, with Makoto Konno dreaming of stumbling in on Kazuko Yoshiyama and Kazuo Fukamachi—the main characters of the original novel—parting ways, and ends with an epilogue of a young Kazuko waking up after Kazuo leaves in her proper time.

See also 
Doraemon

References

Further reading

External links

Kadokawa Shoten's official TokiKake website 
Kadokawa Pictures official TokiKake website 

Entry in The Encyclopedia of Science Fiction

2000s romance films
2006 science fiction films
2006 films
2006 anime films
Animated films about time travel
Animated romance films
Animated teen films
Anime films based on novels
Bandai Entertainment anime titles
Bandai Entertainment manga titles
Coming-of-age anime and manga
Films adapted into comics
Films based on Japanese novels
Films based on science fiction novels
Films based on young adult literature
Films directed by Mamoru Hosoda
Films set in Tokyo
Funimation
Japan Academy Prize for Animation of the Year winners
Japanese animated science fiction films
Japanese romance films
Japanese science fiction comedy-drama films
Madhouse (company)
Romance anime and manga
Films with screenplays by Satoko Okudera
The Girl Who Leapt Through Time
Science fiction romance films
Time loop films